Kadeddulu Ekaram Nela is a 1960 Indian Telugu-language drama film, produced by Ponnaluru Vasanthakumar Reddy under the Ponnaluru Brothers Pvt. Ltd. banner and directed by Jampana. It stars N. T. Rama Rao and Sowcar Janaki, with music composed by C. M. Raju.

Plot 
The film begins in a village where Ramudu (N. T. Rama Rao) a young and energetic guy lives happily with his 1-acre land and two bulls and he is contending with his possession. He loves his maternal uncle Suraiah's (Perumallu) daughter Seeta (Sowcar Janaki). Shavukar Venkaiah (Relangi) a money lender and huge miser who abuses the entire village by giving loans at high interest. Suraiah supports his misdeeds and Ramudu always gives a tough fight to him. Meanwhile, elections are announced in the village in which Shavukar contests, Ramudu makes a wise person Veeraiah to stand as his opponent and succeeds to win. Due to this, Shavukar develops a grudge against Ramudu and files a false case against him that he had not repaid his loan which he has already paid. But unfortunately, Ramudu does not have any proofs, so, the court gives a judgment that Ramudu has to repay the Shavukar's loan within 3 months otherwise his property will be sealed. Now Ramudu decides to get back his land, so, he moves to the city along with his younger brother Gopi (Master Venkateswarlu) where he toils day and night to acquire the required amount. In the village, Suraiah fixes another alliance to Seeta, so, she escapes and reaches the city in search of Ramudu. Meanwhile, Ramudu is implicated in a murder case, Seeta with the help of Gopi saves him and all of them return to the village. Here Shavukar refuses to hand over the land to Ramudu in spite of being repaid. Now the entire villagers stand together including Suraiah and protest against Shavukar. Eventually, Shavukar's henchmen backstab him and try to rob his house when Ramudu comes to his protection. At last, Shavukar realizes his mistake and distributes his property to the villagers. Finally, the movie ends on a happy note with the marriage of Ramudu and Seeta.

Cast 
N. T. Rama Rao as Ramudu
Sowcar Janaki as Seeta
Relangi as Shavukar Venkaiah
Ramana Reddy as Govindaiah
Vangara as Shavukar's brother-in-law
Perumallu as Suraiah
Seetaram as Naamalu
Surabi Balasaraswathi as Kantham
Lakshmikanthamma as Ramudu's mother
Nirmalamma as Suraiah's wife
Master Venkateswarlu as Gopi

Soundtrack 

Music composed by C. M. Raju.

References 

1960s Telugu-language films
Indian drama films
Films directed by Jampana